The Italian Co-belligerent Army (Esercito Cobelligerante Italiano), or Army of the South (Esercito del Sud) were names applied to various division sets of the now former Royal Italian Army during the period when it fought alongside the Allies during World War II from October 1943 onwards. During the same period, the pro-allied Italian Royal Navy and Italian Royal Air Force were known as the Italian Co-belligerent Navy and Italian Co-belligerent Air Force respectively.
From September 1943, pro-Axis Italian forces became the National Republican Army of the newly formed Italian Social Republic.

The Italian Co-belligerent Army was the result of the Allied armistice with Italy on 8 September 1943; King Victor Emmanuel III dismissed Benito Mussolini as Prime Minister in July 1943 following the Allied invasion of Southern Italy, and nominated Marshal of Italy (Maresciallo d'Italia) Pietro Badoglio instead, who later aligned Italy with the Allies to fight the Social Republic's forces and its German allies in Northern Italy.

The Italian Co-belligerent Army fielded between 266,000 and 326,000 troops in the Italian Campaign, of whom 20,000 (later augmented to 50,000, though some sources place this number as high as 99,000) were combat troops and between 150,000 and 190,000 were auxiliary and support troops, along with 66,000 personnel involved with traffic control and infrastructure defence. On the whole, the Italian Co-Belligerent Army made up 1/8 of the fighting force and 1/4 of the entire force of 15th Army Group of the Allied Forces.

I Motorized Grouping 
The first formation of the Co-belligerent Army was the I Motorized Grouping created on 27 November 1943 in San Pietro Vernotico near Brindisi. The units for the I Motorized Grouping were drawn from the 58th Infantry Division "Legnano" and 18th Infantry Division "Messina". Some of the soldiers who joined the unit had managed to evade capture and internment by German forces. The unit was composed of 295 officers and 5,387 men and was created to participate alongside the Allies against Germany in the Italian campaign. The unit was commanded by General Vincenzo Dapino, who led it during its first engagement in the Battle of San Pietro Infine in December of the same year. This action did much to remove the Allies' distrust of Italian soldiers fighting on their side. The unit suffered heavy casualties and was judged to have performed satisfactorily.

Following the service with the American Fifth Army and reorganization, command of the I Motorized Grouping was given to General Umberto Utili and the unit was transferred to the Polish II Corps on the extreme left of the British Eighth Army. In early 1944 the unit was reorganised and expanded into the Italian Liberation Corps.

Italian Liberation Corps 

On 18 April 1944, the I Motorized Grouping (now 16,000 men strong) assumed the name Italian Liberation Corps (or CIL) and was divided into two brigades. The CIL was augmented with the 6,000 men strong 184th Paratroopers Division "Nembo". The CIL's commander was General Umberto Utili. In early 1944, a 5,000 man force of Italians fought on the Gustav Line around Monte Cassino and acquitted itself well. The Italians once again suffered heavy casualties.

Italian Co-belligerent Army from late 1944 to 1945 

The proposal was accepted and in September 1944 the CIL was taken out of the line and send to the rear to be equipped with British materiel, including British Battledress uniforms and helmets. On 24 September 1944 the CIL was disbanded and its personnel and units used to form the first combat groups: "Legnano" and "Folgore". Soon four more combat groups were formed: "Cremona", "Friuli", "Mantova", and "Piceno". These groups were equal in size to weak divisions. The established strength for each was 432 officers, 8,578 other rank, 116 field guns, 170 mortars, 502 light machine guns, and 1,277 motor vehicles. The Combat Groups were given the names of old Royal Army divisions and followed the numbering system of older regiments to some extent. These groups were attached to various American and British formations on the Gothic Line. The following is the "order of battle" of the Italian Co-belligerent Army as of April 1945.

The Chief of Staff of the Armed Forces High Command was Marshal Giovanni Messe, while the Chief of Staff of the Army was Lieutenant General Paolo Berardi.

Combat groups 
Each infantry regiment fielded three infantry battalions, a mortar company armed with British ML 3 inch mortars and an anti-tank company armed with British QF 6 pounder guns. The artillery regiments consisted of four artillery groups with British QF 25 pounder guns, one anti-tank group with British QF 17 pounder guns and one anti-air group armed with British versions of the Bofors 40mm gun.

 Combat Group "Cremona", with men from the 44th Infantry Division "Cremona", attached to British V Corps – Major General Clemente Primieri
 21st Infantry Regiment "Cremona"
 22nd Infantry Regiment "Cremona"
 7th Artillery Regiment
 CXLIV Engineer Battalion
 Combat Group "Friuli", with men from the 20th Infantry Division "Friuli", attached to British X Corps – Major General Arturo Scattini
 87th Infantry Regiment "Friuli"
 88th Infantry Regiment "Friuli"
 35th Artillery Regiment
 CXX Engineer Battalion
 Combat Group "Folgore", with men from the 184th Paratroopers Division "Nembo", attached to British XIII Corps – Major General Giorgio Morigi
 Paratroopers Regiment "Nembo"
 Navy Regiment "San Marco"
 Paratroopers Artillery Regiment "Folgore"
 CLXXXIV Engineer Battalion
 Combat Group "Legnano", attached to US II Corps – Major General Umberto Utili
 68th Infantry Regiment "Palermo", with men from the 58th Infantry Division "Legnano"
 Special Infantry Regiment, with 2x Alpini battalions (remnants of the 3rd Alpini Regiment of the 1st Alpine Division "Taurinense") and 1x Bersaglieri battalion (remnants of the 4th Bersaglieri Regiment)
 11th Artillery Regiment, with men from the 104th Infantry Division "Mantova"
 LI Engineer Battalion
 Combat Group "Mantova" – Major General Bologna
 76th Infantry Regiment "Napoli", with men from the 54th Infantry Division "Napoli"
 114th Infantry Regiment "Mantova", with men from the 104th Infantry Division "Mantova"
 155th Artillery Regiment, with men from the 155th Infantry Division "Emilia"
 CIV Engineer Battalion
 Combat Group "Piceno", with men from the 152nd Infantry Division "Piceno" – Major General Emanuele Beraudo di Pralormo
 235th Infantry Regiment "Piceno"
 336th Infantry Regiment "Pistoia"
 152nd Artillery Regiment
 CLII Engineer Battalion

Auxiliary divisions 
In addition to the Combat Groups the Italian Co-belligerent Army included eight Auxiliary Divisions for labor, support and second lined duties. At their peak the division fielded about 150,000-190,000. These auxiliary units were the following:

 205th Division, supported US Army Air Forces in the Mediterranean Command
 51st Aviation Group (Infantry and AA Artillery Air Force Regiment)
 52nd Aviation Group (Infantry and AA Artillery Air Force Regiment)
 53rd Aviation Group (Infantry and AA Artillery Air Force Regiment)
 54th Aviation Group (Infantry and AA Artillery Air Force Regiment)
 55th Aviation Group (Infantry and AA Artillery Air Force Regiment)
 209th Division, supported 1st British District
 210th Division, supported US Fifth Army
 212th Division, the largest of the Auxiliary Divisions, at its height its complements exceeded 44,000 men providing rear area support from Naples to Pisa and Livorno
 227th Division, supported 3rd British District
 228th Division, supported UK Eighth Army
 230th Division, supported British forces
 541st Infantry, Coast Artillery and AA Artillery Regiment
 403rd Pioneer and Labor Regiment (Engineer Corps)
 404th Pioneer and Labor Regiment (Engineer Corps)
 406th Pioneer and Labor Regiment (Engineer Corps)
 501st Security Battalion
 510th Security Battalion
 514th Security Battalion
 XXI Supply Trains Group (Regiment-sized unit)
 231st Division, supported British XIII Corps of the US Fifth Army

On the whole the Italian Co-Belligerent Army made up 1/8 of the fighting force and 1/4 of the entire force of 15th Army Group of the Allied Forces.

Internal security divisions 
Not directly dependent from the Allied Headquarters in Italy the Co-Belligerent Army also deployed three Internal Security Divisions (Divisioni di Sicurezza Interna) for internal security duties:

 Internal Security Division "Sabauda", in Enna on Sicily
 I Security Brigade
 45th Infantry Regiment
 46th Infantry Regiment
 II Security Brigade
 145th Infantry Regiment, detached from the 227th Coastal Division
 16th Field Artillery Regiment (without artillery pieces)
 CXXX Engineer Battalion
 Internal Security Division "Aosta", in Palermo on Sicily
 III Security Brigade
 5th Infantry Regiment
 6th Infantry Regiment
 IV Security Brigade
 139th Infantry Regiment, detached from the 47th Infantry Division "Bari"
 22nd Field Artillery Regiment (without artillery pieces)
 XXVIII Engineer Battalion
 Internal Security Division "Calabria", in Cagliari on Sardinia
 V Security Brigade
 59th Infantry Regiment
 60th Infantry Regiment
 VI Security Brigade
 236th Infantry Regiment, detached from the 152nd Infantry Division "Piceno"
 40th Field Artillery Regiment (without artillery pieces)
 XXXI Engineer Battalion

Italian Army
In 1946, the Kingdom of Italy became the Italian Republic. In a similar manner, what had been the royalist Co-Belligerent Army simply became the Italian Army (Esercito Italiano).

Casualties 

The Italian Liberation Corps suffered 1,868 killed and 5,187 wounded during the Italian campaign; the Italian Auxiliary Divisions lost 744 men killed, 2,202 wounded and 109 missing. Some sources estimate the overall number of members of the Italian regular forces killed on the Allied side as 5,927.

Notable members
 Carlo Azeglio Ciampi, President of the Italian Republic from 1999 to 2006.
 Eugenio Corti
 Giovanni Messe
 Gianni Agnelli
 Valerio Zurlini
 Clemente Primieri
 Umberto Utili

See also
 Italian Liberation Corps
 Italian Service Units
 Military history of Italy during World War II
 Italian Campaign in World War II
 Mediterranean Theatre of World War II
 Battle of Mignano Monte Lungo
 Battle of Bologna
 Operation Grapeshot
 Gothic Line
 Italian Royal Army, Kingdom of Italy
 Italian National Republican Army, Italian Social Republic
 Italian Co-Belligerent Air Force
 Italian Co-Belligerent Navy
 Co-belligerence
 Operation Herring, the last combat parachute jump in the European Theater of Operations, made by Italian troops.

References

Sources
 Di Capua, Giovanni, Resistenzialità versus Resistenza, Rubettino, 2005, 
 Holland, James, Italy's Sorrow: A Year of War 1944-1945, St. Martin's Press, New York, 
 Jowett, Phillip, The Italian Army 1940-45 (3): Italy 1943-45, Osprey Publishing, Westminster, MD, 
 Mollo, Andrew, The Armed Forces of World War II, Crown Publishing, New York, 

Military units and formations of Italy in World War II
Co-Belligerent
Italian Army (pre-1946)
Military units and formations established in 1943
1943 establishments in Italy